Choerophryne exclamitans is a species of frogs in the family Microhylidae. It is endemic to Papua New Guinea and only known from two locations on the slopes of Mount Shungol in the Morobe Province. It might be more widely distributed.

Description
Adult males measure  and females  in snout–vent length. The snout is bluntly rounded when viewed from above but truncate when viewed laterally. The eyes are moderately large. In males, the tympanum is hidden whereas it is visible in females. The dorsum and the sides are tan, mottled with dark brown or black. Females are generally lighter than most males. The venter is  dark gray, peppered with light gray. The iris is bronze.

The male advertisement call is a rapid series of 3–48 peeping notes, emitted at an average rate of 4.7 notes per second. The dominant frequency is about 3.4 kHz.

Habitat and conservation
They have been observed on the upper leaf
surfaces of shrubs or vines some 1 to 3 meters above the ground. Males call at night. No significant threats to this species are known. It is moderately common but not known from any protected area.

References

exclamitans
Endemic fauna of Papua New Guinea
Amphibians of Papua New Guinea
Frogs of Asia
Amphibians described in 2005
Taxonomy articles created by Polbot